Nam is an unclassified extinct language preserved in Tibetan transcriptions in a number of Dunhuang manuscript fragments. The manuscript fragments are held at the British Library and the Bibliothèque nationale de France.

Classification
According to Ikeda Takumi, the research of F. W. Thomas, published in 1948, concluded that Nam "was one of the old Qiang [languages] spoken around the Nam mountain range near Koko nor in Qinghai province", associated with a country called Nam tig which is mentioned in some historical records. However, Ikeda further states that Thomas' conclusions were widely criticized.

Glottolog accepts that it was at least Sino-Tibetan.

Lexicon
Wen (1981: 18–19) lists the following basic vocabulary items, which have been taken from Thomas (1948: 399–451).

References

Further reading

 Chén Zōngxiáng 陳宗祥 (1994). 〈敦煌古藏文拼冩的“南語”手卷的名稱問題〉Dūnhuáng Gǔzàngwén pīnxiěde 'Nányǔ' shǒujuànde míngchēng wèntí [The identity of the Dūnhuáng 'Nam language' scroll transcribed in Old Tibetan].《四川藏學研究》Sìchuān Zàngxué yánjiū 2. 中國藏學出版社 Zhōngguó Zàngxué chūbǎnshè, 164–180頁．（筆名爲寶羊與王建民合冩）
 Chén Zōngxiáng 陳宗祥 (1997). 〈敦煌古藏文拼冩的“南語”手卷的有關地名考釋〉Dūnhuáng Gǔzàngwén pīnxiěde 'Nányǔ' shǒujuànde yǒuguān dìmíng kǎoshì [Explanation of the places names in the Dūnhuáng 'Nam language' scroll transcribed in Old Tibetan].《四川藏學研究》Sìchuān Zàngxué yánjiū 4．四川民族出版社 Sìchuān mínzú chūbǎnshè. 684–698．
 
 Lalou, Marcelle (1939). “Sur la langue « nam ».” Journal Asiatique 231: 453. 
 
 
 Thomas, Frederick William (1948). Nam, an ancient language of the Sino-Tibetan borderland.  London: Oxford University Press.
 
 Wén Yòu  聞宥 (1981). 〈論所謂南語〉Lùn suǒwèi Nányǔ (On the 'Nam' language)《民族語文》. Mínzú yǔwén 1: 16–25.

Languages attested from the 1st millennium
Unclassified Sino-Tibetan languages
Unclassified languages of Asia